Corporal Larry E. Smedley National Vietnam War Museum is located in Orlando, Florida in Orange County, Florida. 
3400 N. Tanner Rd, Orlando, FL 32826.
Exhibitions include Vietnam War artifacts, equipment, and photographs. The museum's collection includes an A-4 Skyhawk, a "River Rat" patrol boat, a commemorative wall, Bell UH-1 "Huey" Dustoff helicopter, patriotic art, and a Vietnam War mural. The museum is named for the late  Larry E. Smedley, a Marine corporal who led his squad courageously against numerically superior forces and was awarded the Medal of Honor posthumously.

References

External links
Corporal Larry E. Smedley, National Vietnam War Museum website

Museums in Orlando, Florida
Military and war museums in Florida
Vietnam
Vietnam War museums